The 1980–81 West Midlands (Regional) League season was the 81st in the history of the West Midlands (Regional) League, an English association football competition for semi-professional and amateur teams based in the West Midlands county, Shropshire, Herefordshire, Worcestershire and southern Staffordshire.

Premier Division

The Premier Division featured 21 clubs which competed in the division last season, along with one club, promoted from Division One:
Rushall Olympic

League table

References

External links

1980–81
8